Sherlock Holmes: Consulting Detective is a game originally published by Sleuth Publications in 1981. Multiple expansions and reprints of the game have since been released.

Premise and gameplay 
In the game, the player (or players) reads a brief introduction to a case, then decides where to look for clues, and consults a booklet telling what clues are found at that location. When a player believes he or she knows the details of the case, the player moves on to the quiz book and answers questions about the case. Players earn points by answering questions correctly, but lose points for each location visited beforehand.

The game is made up of booklets, maps, a clue-filled reproduction of The Times and a small directory telling the player which London locale to visit to speak to a character. Lacking a board, it functions as a hybrid between a traditional gamebook and a conventional tabletop game.

The original game contains ten scenarios. Expansion packs were released including The Mansion Murders (1983, containing five adventures), "The Queen's Park Affair" (1984, one adventure over three days), and  "Adventures by Gaslight" (1986, one adventure over five days). West End Adventures (1990, containing six adventures) was a stand-alone expansion.  Other scenarios, like "Sherlock Holmes & the Baby" (1986) were printed in specialty publications. 

The original game was packaged in a paperboard box; the deluxe edition was bound in a leatherette binder. 

Gumshoe, the Hardboiled Detective in the Thirties (1985) by the same game designer and publisher has a similar premise. Here, the player assumes the role of a detective in 1930s San Francisco. Clues are found in city maps, mug shots, fingerprints, newspapers and crime reports.

Reprints

Ystari Games published a French version of the game in 2011. The book was translated into English in 2012 and subsequently reprinted in 2015. Ystari has released expansions, some newly written by French authors and others taken from The Queen's Park Affair and The Mansion Murders sets.

Since 2016, Space Cowboys has published a series of standalone Sherlock Holmes: Consulting Detective games with separate sets of 10 cases, which includes revised versions of older cases. These sets include "Jack the Ripper & West End Adventures" [West End Adventures], "The Thames Murders and Other Cases" [original 10 cases], and "Carlton House and Queen's Park" [Mansion Murders and Queen's Park Affair]. A fourth set containing new cases, "The Baker Street Irregulars", was released in 2020.

Video game adaptations 
ICOM Simulations adapted Sherlock Holmes: Consulting Detective into a video game, also called Sherlock Holmes: Consulting Detective, which they published in 1991. Two sequels followed in 1992 and 1993, respectively: Sherlock Holmes: Consulting Detective Vol. II and Sherlock Holmes: Consulting Detective Vol. III.

Reception
In the May 1984 edition of Imagine (Issue 14), Dave Durant gave a positive review, stating "the game runs well and offers a different form of mental exercise to doing the crossword. A welcome change in the face of gaming."

In the August 1983 edition of White Dwarf (Issue 44), Charles Vasey commented, "The success of Consulting Detective reminds me of the success of Call of Cthulhu both being fixed in an era that appears less amenable to fantasy than it has proved to be."

In the July 1984 edition of White Dwarf (Issue 55), Nic Grecas gave it an excellent overall rating of 9 out of 10, and stated that "I like this game very much and urge you not to be put off by the high price - it's worth every penny!"

In the November–December 1984 edition of Space Gamer (Issue 71), William A. Barton gave high marks for this game, saying, "the Sherlock Holmes Consulting Detective Game is the best mystery game I've ever had the privilege to be stumped by. After acing most games of Clue or 221B Baker Street with no sweat, it's a refreshing feeling. The folks at Sleuth Publications are to be commended for the effort they put into this game [...] As both a confirmed Sherlockian and a dedicated gamer, I can't recommend this game highly enough. Unless you simply hate mysteries - buy it!  Definitely not elementary."

Games included this game' in its top 100 games of 1986, commenting "The 10 cases supplied are detailed and atmospheric, giving you the uncanny feeling of actually living in a Holmes story."

In the January 1990 edition  of Games International (Issue 12), Kevin Jacklin called it "The best of all the Sherlock Holmes games." He commented that "Although it is possible to play the game competitively (and extremely well solo), it is best enjoyed when players discuss amongst themselves the merits of visiting various clue points one at a time. The enjoyment comes from seeing if one can unscramble a case, not merely from scoring points."

In a retrospective review of Sherlock Holmes: Consulting Detective in Black Gate, Bob Byrne said "Overall, it looks good, it definitely has a Holmes feel and it works solo. I’d give it three pipes on a scale of five."

Awards
At the 1983 Origins Awards, Sherlock Holmes: Consulting Detective was awarded the Charles S. Roberts Award for "Best Fantasy Boardgame of 1982".

The German translation of the game, Sherlock Holmes Criminal-Cabinet, won "Spiel des Jahres" ("Game of the Year") in 1985.

Other reviews
 Casus Belli #31 (Feb 1986)
1982 Games 100 in Games
Asimov's Science Fiction v7 n13 (1983 12 Mid)
Jeux & Stratégie #36 (as "Détective Conseil")

References

External links
 Sherlock Holmes: Consulting Detective site at Space Cowboys
 

Cooperative board games
Licensed board games
Origins Award winners
Sherlock Holmes in games
Spiel des Jahres winners
Tabletop games